This is the list of universities and colleges in Laos.

 Champasack University - Champassak Province
 Lao-Korean College
 National University of Laos - Vientiane Capital
 Rattana Business Administration College (RBAC) - Vientiane Capital, Business School
 Savannakhet University - Savannakhet Province
 Souphanouvong University - Luang Prabang Province 
 University of Health Sciences - Vientiane Capital, under Ministry of Health
 Vientiane - Hanoi Friendship Technical Vocational College - Vientiane Capital

Former
 Sisavangvong University

 
Universities
Laos

Laos